Paul Thompson (born 19 April 1958) is a former Australian rules footballer who played with Melbourne in the Victorian Football League (VFL).

Notes

External links 		
		
		
		
		
		
		
1958 births
Living people
Australian rules footballers from Victoria (Australia)		
Melbourne Football Club players